Falcon Entertainment (also known as Falcon Studios), a United States company based in San Francisco, California, is one of the world's largest producers of gay pornography.

Founded in 1971 by Chuck Holmes, the company is one of the most recognizable brand names in gay pornography. The owners/managers of several of its major American competitors, Hot House Entertainment, Colt Studios, Channel 1 Releasing and Titan Media (Steven Scarborough, John Rutherford, Chi Chi LaRue, Bruce Cam, respectively) previously worked for Falcon.

Products 
Falcon has issued more than 400 pornographic films  under several brand names comprising The Falcon Family of Companies:

 Falcon Studios is the group's flagship brand 
 Jocks Studios focuses on younger models 
 Mustang Studios features more mature models 
 Massive Studios focuses on muscular and rugged models
 The Falcon International Collection shoots films in Europe and focuses on European (mostly Eastern European) models
 The Alone With Series includes interviews with performers that masturbate alone rather than having sex with another performer

The company operates a website which serves as a retail outlet for its DVDs and sex toys. Video on demand is also available, as well as the ability to purchase and download videos. Live webcast sex shows are available in a membership area called Falcon TV; membership also includes discounts on other products. Several of the dildos offered for sale are modeled on the penises of Falcon's performers.

Corporate history 
Prior to 2004 the Falcon Family of Companies was owned by parent company Conwest Resources Inc.. Conwest was, in turn, owned by the Charles M. Holmes Foundation, a charitable foundation based in Portland, Oregon. The foundation supports a wide range of organizations, including groups protecting lesbian, gay, bisexual, and transgender rights, organizations which provide support to people living with HIV/AIDS, and others that help homeless youth or fight pediatric cancer and autism.

In 2004, the company's management bought Falcon from Conwest through 3Media Corp., a company that was formed by Falcon executives Terry Mahaffey and Todd Montgomery. 3Media will eventually assume the Conwest name. The buyout was arranged in order to separate the business from the Charles M. Holmes Foundation, which continues to function as a nonprofit organization.

Terry Mahaffey died on October 31, 2005.  Todd Montgomery left the company on May 22, 2008. Steve Johnson became the president and chief executive officer of Falcon and Conwest.

On December 19, 2010, video-on-demand company AEBN purchased Falcon Studios for an undisclosed amount of money. AEBN merged Falcon Studios and Raging Stallion, although the company said that both brands would remain distinct and AEBN's output would remain constant at sixty DVD titles a year (forty from Raging Stallion). Falcon Chief Executive Officer James Hansen would remain with the company as the chief financial officer of Falcon Studios.

Notable directors 

 Chi Chi LaRue
 John Rutherford
 Steven Scarborough

Notable performers 
The company, like other studios have performers known as 'Exclusives', meaning though only work for one studio per contract time.
In 2005, they released Heaven to Hell (directed by Chi Chi LaRue) which was only cast with Falcon exclusives.

(alphabetical by first name)

See also 

CzechBoys
 List of companies headquartered in San Francisco
 List of gay pornographic movie studios

References

External links
 
 

American gay pornographic film studios
Film production companies of the United States
Entertainment companies based in California
Pornography in San Francisco
Companies based in San Francisco
Entertainment companies established in 1971
Mass media companies established in 1971
1971 establishments in California